Isocossus seria is a moth in the family Cossidae. It is found on Borneo. The habitat consists of coastal areas.

The wingspan is 15 mm. The forewings are pale grey with blotchy brownish grey striae.

References

Natural History Museum Lepidoptera generic names catalog

Cossinae
Moths described in 1986
Moths of Asia